= Father Jerzy Popiełuszko Street =

Street in Opole, Poland

Coordinates: 50°38′2″N 17°57′26″E

- Interactive map of Father Jerzy Popiełuszko Street
- Length: 2.3 kilometres (7,500 ft)

Father Jerzy Popiełuszko Street in Opole is a prominent street in the Groszowice district of Opole. It begins at the intersection of Father Jerzy Popiełuszki Street and Oświęcimska Street. It is one-way until the intersection with Wiktora Gorzołki Street. It then runs north towards the city center. At the border between the districts of Groszowice and Nowa Wieś Królewska, at the intersection with Podmiejska Street, it turns into Aleja Przyjaźni Street. The Opole Groszowice railway station and the Church of St. Catherine of Alexandria are located on this street. It is part of provincial route 423.
